Peters is a small lunar impact crater in the north-northeastern part of the Moon, lying in the gap between Neison to the west and Arnold to the southeast. Due south of Peters is the crater Moigno.

This is not a particularly prominent feature, having a low rim and an interior floor that has been almost completely submerged by lava flows. The rim is circular and only lightly worn, with a notch along the southeast. The inner surface is level and almost featureless.

References

 
 
 
 
 
 
 
 
 
 
 
 

Impact craters on the Moon